Golovino is a rural locality (a village) and the administrative center of Golovinskoye Rural Settlement, Sudogodsky District, Vladimir Oblast, Russia. The population was 4,408 as of 2010. There are 24 streets.

Geography 
Golovino is located 31 km west of Sudogda (the district's administrative centre) by road. Kamenets is the nearest rural locality.

References 

Rural localities in Sudogodsky District